The South Saskatchewan Region is a land-use framework region in southern Alberta, Canada. One of seven in the province, each is intended to develop and implement a regional plan, complementing the planning efforts of member municipalities in order to coordinate future growth. Corresponding roughly to major watersheds while following municipal boundaries, these regions are managed by Alberta Environment and Parks.

As it includes the Calgary Metropolitan Region, the largest urban area in Alberta, the South Saskatchewan Region has the highest population of any Alberta land-use region.

Communities

The following municipalities are contained in the South Saskatchewan Region.

 

Cities
 Airdrie
 Brooks
 Calgary
 Chestermere
 Lethbridge
 Medicine Hat

Towns
 Bassano
 Black Diamond
 Bow Island
 Canmore
 Cardston
 Claresholm
 Coaldale
 Coalhurst
 Cochrane
 Crossfield
 Fort Macleod
 Granum
 High River
 Irricana
 Magrath
 Milk River
 Nanton
 Nobleford
 Okotoks
 Picture Butte
 Pincher Creek
 Raymond
 Redcliff
 Stavely

Towns (continued)
 Strathmore
 Taber
 Turner Valley
 Vauxhall
 Vulcan

Villages
 Arrowwood
 Barnwell
 Barons
 Beiseker
 Carmangay
 Champion
 Coutts
 Cowley
 Duchess
 Foremost
 Glenwood
 Hill Spring
 Hussar
 Lomond
 Longview
 Milo
 Rockyford
 Rosemary
 Standard
 Stirling
 Warner

Summer villages
 Ghost Lake
 Waiparous

Municipal districts
 Municipal District of Bighorn
 Cardston County
 Cypress County
 Foothills County
 County of Forty Mile
 Lethbridge County
 County of Newell
 Municipal District of Pincher Creek
 Municipal District of Ranchland
 Rocky View County
 Municipal District of Taber
 Vulcan County
 County of Warner No. 5
 Wheatland County
 Municipal District of Willow Creek

Specialized municipalities
 Crowsnest Pass

Improvement districts
 Improvement District No. 4 (Waterton)
 Kananaskis Improvement District

Indian reserves
 Blood 148
 Blood 148A
 Eden Valley 216
 Piikani 147
 Peigan Timber Limit B
 Siksika 146
 Stoney 142, 143, 144
 Stoney 142B
 Tsuu T'ina 145

References

Alberta land-use framework regions